Bilis Balita (Fast News or Quick News) is a news bulletin of Studio 23 developed by ABS-CBN Corporation via ABS-CBN News and Current Affairs featuring local and international news. It airs daily and frequently anchored by TJ Manotoc. It first aired on March 7, 2011.

Bilis Balita, together with Iba-Balita aired its final broadcast on January 16, 2014 as the TV channel to launch ABS-CBN Sports and Action.

See also
List of Philippine television shows
ABS-CBN News and Current Affairs
Studio 23
News Patrol
Iba-Balita
Iba-Balita Ngayon

External links
 www.studio23.tv

Studio 23 news shows
2011 Philippine television series debuts
2014 Philippine television series endings